The 85th Street–Forest Parkway station is a skip-stop station on the BMT Jamaica Line of the New York City Subway, located on Jamaica Avenue in Woodhaven, Queens. The J train serves this station at all times. The Z train skips this station when it operates.

History 
This station opened on May 28, 1917 under the Brooklyn Union Elevated Railroad, an affiliate of the Brooklyn Rapid Transit Company.

From the late-1950s into the 1960s the New York City Transit Authority had a proposal to realign the BMT Jamaica Line between Grant or Nichols Avenue (east of Crescent Street station) and 80th Street and Jamaica Avenue (just west of this station). This realignment would have also included a bi-directional express track. The realignment was never carried out. "85th Street" was added to the name in 1966.

In February 2023, the Metropolitan Transportation Authority announced that this station would temporarily close for renovations as part of a station renewal contract at four stations on the Jamaica Line. The Queens-bound platforms at 85th Street-Forest Parkway and Cypress Hills will close in late winter of 2024. The closure will shift to the Manhattan-bound platforms at these stations in the summer of 2024. Work includes platform renewals, replacement of stairs, canopies, and windscreens, installation of artwork, and minimizing the gaps between the train and the platform edge. The work will be performed by Gramercy PJS Joint-Venture.

Station layout

The station has two tracks and two side platforms, with space for a center track.

Exits
The north exit, which leads to 85th Street and has a crossunder, is near Forest Park. The south exit, which leads to Forest Parkway, was removed.

References

External links 

 
 Station Reporter — J Train 
 The Subway Nut — 85th Street–Forest Parkway Pictures 
 85th Street entrance from Google Maps Street View
Platforms from Google Maps Street View

BMT Jamaica Line stations
1917 establishments in New York City
New York City Subway stations in Queens, New York
Railway stations in the United States opened in 1917
Woodhaven, Queens